Patrick Kelly (born 18 October 1995) is a Scotland 7s professional rugby union player who plays for Glasgow Warriors. He previously played for London Scottish. Kelly plays at centre.

Rugby Union career

Amateur career

Kelly was at Millburn Academy in Inverness before winning a scholarship to Merchiston Castle School in Edinburgh at the age of 15. He captained Merchiston to the Brewin Dolphin Scottish Schools Cup final in 2012.

He played amateur rugby with Highland RFC. When starting studying with Glasgow University he moved on to play with French club Pays d'Aix Rugby Club, now Provence Rugby, in a gap year.

Kelly moved to play for Glasgow Hawks and played for them at the start of 2016. He later won a place to be coached in New Zealand in the summer of 2016 winning the John Macphail Scholarship.

He also started with the Hawks in the Scottish Premiership for season 2016-17, and again for the 2017-18 season. Kelly was drafted to Ayr for the 2018-19 season.

Professional career
In 2015-16 he won a place in the Glasgow and West of Scotland branch of the Scottish Rugby Academy as a Stage 3 (assigned to a professional club) player – Kelly was assigned to Glasgow Warriors.

He made his debut for Warriors against Canada A  on 30 August 2016, scoring a try in a 63 – 0 win.

He was then loaned to London Scottish. He made his debut for the Exiles on 17 September 2016 against Rotherham Titans, scoring a try in the 31-30 win for Scottish in the 2016–17 RFU Championship.

He made his competitive debut for Glasgow Warriors in the Pro12 against the Ospreys on 25 November 2016. Kelly graduated from the Scottish Rugby Academy by signing a professional contract with the Warriors for the 2017-18 season.

Kelly was paired with Sam Johnson in the centre for the Warriors in their opening match of the 2017-18 season - against Northampton Saints at Bridgehaugh Park, Stirling on 19 August 2017.

He made his first appearance of the 2018-19 season for the Warriors in their 50 -17 defeat of Harlequins at North Inch, Perth in a preseason friendly on 18 August 2018.

International career

He was capped internationally by Scotland U20. Capped for Scotland 7s, he scored his first try in the World Sevens Series on 25 January 2020. He competed at the 2022 Rugby World Cup Sevens in Cape Town.

References

External links 
Scrum magazine Profile
The Scotsman profile on John MacPhail Scholarship
Rugby World magazine Profile

1995 births
Living people
Scottish rugby union players
Glasgow Warriors players
Rugby union players from Inverness
Provence Rugby players
Highland RFC players
Glasgow Hawks players
London Scottish F.C. players
Ayr RFC players
Scotland international rugby sevens players
Rugby union centres
Rugby union wings
Scottish expatriate rugby union players
Scottish expatriate sportspeople in France
Expatriate rugby union players in France
People educated at Millburn Academy
People educated at Merchiston Castle School
Rugby sevens players at the 2022 Commonwealth Games